Anolis gingivinus, also known as the Anguilla Bank tree anole, Anguilla bank anole, and Anguilla anole, is a species of anole lizard that is endemic to the Caribbean Lesser Antilles islands of Anguilla and its satellites, such as Saint Martin, and Saint Barthélemy.

Geographic range
It is found on the Anguilla Bank of islands, which comprise Anguilla and its satellites, Saint Martin, and Saint Barthélemy; and on the smaller, nearby Sombrero bank (politically part of Anguilla).

Description
Males can reach a length of 72 mm snout-to-vent. It has an olive to light green dorsal ground color, with a broad mid-dorsal stripe and a light stripe along its flanks. Its belly is cream to bright yellow. Males may also have gray-brown marbling or can be heavily spotted.

Ecology
It is widespread and common on Anguilla and many of its satellites, though it is heavily preyed on there by American kestrels. It was the only anole species on Anguilla and throughout most of its range, until the recent introduction to Anguilla of A. carolinensis. A. gingivinus coexists on Saint Martin with A. pogus. Their distribution there does not completely overlap, and where they are both found they appear to fill different niches, for example by A. gingivinus preferring higher and more exposed perches.

Notes

References

.

Anoles
Lizards of the Caribbean
Reptiles of Anguilla
Reptiles of Saint Barthélemy
Reptiles of Saint Martin (island)
Reptiles described in 1864
Taxa named by Edward Drinker Cope